Gary Samuel McCloy (born 28 May 1969) is an Irish international lawn and indoor bowler.

Bowls career
He won a bronze medal in the fours at the 2000 World Outdoor Bowls Championship in Johannesburg.

He was also part of the fours team that secured the gold medal for Northern Ireland at the 1998 Commonwealth Games in Kuala Lumpur, Malaysia, the other members were Ian McClure, Martin McHugh and Neil Booth.

In 2007 he won the pairs silver medal at the Atlantic Bowls Championships.

He also won the 1994 and 2019 Irish National Bowls Championships singles title.

In 2022, he won his fifth national title when winning the triples at the Irish National Bowls Championships.

Personal life
He is married to fellow Irish international bowler Donna McNally and they run the Ballybrakes bowls shop within the Ballybrakes Community Bowls Club.

References

External links 
 

1969 births
Living people
Male lawn bowls players from Northern Ireland
Commonwealth Games gold medallists for Northern Ireland
Commonwealth Games medallists in lawn bowls
Bowls players at the 1998 Commonwealth Games
Bowls players at the 2002 Commonwealth Games
Bowls players at the 2010 Commonwealth Games
Bowls European Champions
Medallists at the 1998 Commonwealth Games